Diego Alejandro Rosales Islas (born 4 April 1998) is a Mexican professional footballer who plays as a left-back for Liga de Expansión MX club Pumas Tabasco, on loan from UNAM.

References

External links
 
 
 
 

1998 births
Living people
Mexican footballers
Ascenso MX players
Liga Premier de México players
Club Universidad Nacional footballers
Liga MX players
Association football defenders